Alejandro "Álex" Abrines Redondo (born August 1, 1993) is a Spanish professional basketball player for FC Barcelona of the Spanish Liga ACB and the EuroLeague. Standing at 6 ft 6 in (1.98 m), he plays the shooting guard and small forward positions.

Professional career

Spain
Between 2010 and 2012, Abrines played for Clínicas Rincón and Unicaja. He was traded to Spanish club FC Barcelona in July 2012.

On June 27, 2013, Abrines was selected by the Oklahoma City Thunder with the 32nd overall pick in the 2013 NBA draft.

On May 19, 2015, Abrines re-signed with Barcelona until 2019. In May 2016, he was named the EuroLeague Rising Star. He played four seasons for Barcelona, winning three titles with the club – one Spanish ACB league championship, one Spanish King's Cup, and one Spanish Supercup. On July 19, 2016, Abrines parted ways with Barcelona.

Oklahoma City Thunder
On July 23, 2016, Abrines signed with the Oklahoma City Thunder. He made his debut for the Thunder in their season opener on October 26, 2016, scoring three points off the bench in a 103–97 win over the Philadelphia 76ers. On December 21, 2016, he hit five three-pointers and finished with a career-best 18 points in a 121–110 win over the New Orleans Pelicans. On February 24, 2017, in his first career start, Abrines set a new career high with 19 points in a 110–93 win over the Los Angeles Lakers.

On December 9, 2017, Abrines, starting in place of the injured Paul George, scored a career-high 20 points in a 102–101 overtime win over the Memphis Grizzlies.

On November 1, 2018, Abrines had 25 points on five 3-pointers in a 111–107 win over the Charlotte Hornets. Later that month on November 30 Abrines scored 21 points off a career-high seven three pointers in a 124-109 win over the Atlanta Hawks.

On February 9, 2019, Abrines was waived by the Thunder.

Return to Spain
On July 12, 2019, Abrines signed a two-year deal with FC Barcelona with the option of a third year. On June 30, 2021, he extended his contract with the team until 2026. Abrines suffered an injury on his knee on September 17 and was ruled out for four months.

National team career
Abrines has played with the junior national teams of Spain. He won the gold medal at the 2011 FIBA Europe Under-18 Championship, where he was named to the All-Tournament Team, as well as being named the tournament's MVP. He also played at the 2012 FIBA Europe Under-20 Championship, where he won the bronze medal. In 2016, he won a bronze medal at the Rio Olympics with the senior Spain national basketball team. He also played at EuroBasket 2017.

Career statistics

NBA

Regular season

|-
| style="text-align:left;"| 
| style="text-align:left;"| Oklahoma City
| 68 || 6 || 15.5 || .393 || .381 || .898 || 1.3 || .6 || .5 || .1 || 6.0
|-
| style="text-align:left;"| 
| style="text-align:left;"| Oklahoma City
| 75 || 8 || 15.1 || .395 || .380 || .848 || 1.5 || .4 || .5 || .1 || 4.7
|-
| style="text-align:left;"| 
| style="text-align:left;"| Oklahoma City
| 31 || 2 || 19.0 || .357 || .323 || .923 || 1.5 || .6 || .5 || .2 || 5.3
|- class="sortbottom"
| style="text-align:center;" colspan="2"| Career
| 174 || 16 || 16.0 || .387 || .368 || .880 || 1.4 || .5 || .5 || .1 || 5.3

Playoffs

|-
| style="text-align:left;"| 2017
| style="text-align:left;"| Oklahoma City
| 5 || 0 || 16.0 || .348 || .294 || .750 || 1.8 || .8 || .0 || .0 || 4.8
|-
| style="text-align:left;"| 2018
| style="text-align:left;"| Oklahoma City
| 6 || 0 || 18.3 || .400 || .462 || 1.000 || 2.7 || .3 || .8 || .3 || 4.0
|- class="sortbottom"
| style="text-align:center;" colspan="2"| Career
| 11 || 0 || 17.3 || .372 || .367 || .833 || 2.3 || .5 || .5 || .2 || 4.4

EuroLeague

|-
| style="text-align:left;"| 2011–12
| style="text-align:left;"| Unicaja
| 6 || 1 || 11.7 || .217 || .133 || .750 || 1.2 || .5 || .3 || .3 || 2.5 || .8
|-
| style="text-align:left;"| 2012–13
| style="text-align:left;" rowspan=7| Barcelona
| 15 || 2 || 11.2 || .446 || .324 || 1.000 || 1.1 || .3 || .4 || .1 || 5.1 || 4.0
|-
| style="text-align:left;"| 2013–14
| 28 || 4 || 16.6 || .456 || .369 || .769 || 1.3 || .7 || .4 || .1 || 6.7 || 4.5
|-
| style="text-align:left;"| 2014–15
| 23 || 3 || 18.2 || .450 || .341 || .771 || 1.5 || 1.7 || .7 || .2 || 7.6 || 6.7
|-
| style="text-align:left;"| 2015–16
| 25 || 2 || 19.2 || .469 || .417 || .833 || 2.2 || .8 || .6 || .1 || 9.3 || 8.8
|-
| style="text-align:left;"| 2019-20
| 25 || 3 || 14.8 || .465 || .462 || .833 || 2.1 || .4 || .6 || .1 || 5.2 || 4.9
|-
| style="text-align:left;"| 2020-21
| 39 || 33 || 18.4 || .427 || .423 || .903 || 1.8 || .7 || .6 || .2 || 6.1 || 4.7
|-
| style="text-align:left;"| 2021-22
| 13 || 5 || 14.6 || .500 || .511 || 1.000 || 1.7 || .2 || .3 || .2 || 7 || 5

|- class="sortbottom"
| style="text-align:center;" colspan="2"| Career
| 174 || 53 || 16.6 || .448 || .399 || .843 || 1.7 || .7 || .5 || .1 || 6.6 || 5.4

Awards and accomplishments

Club
Spanish League: 2013–14
Spanish King's Cup: 2013
Spanish Supercup: 2015

Individual
2013–14 ACB season: All-Young players Team
2014–15 ACB season: All-Young players Team
2015–16 EuroLeague: EuroLeague Rising Star

Spanish junior national team
2011 FIBA Europe Under-18 Championship: All-Tournament Team
2011 FIBA Europe Under-18 Championship: MVP

Personal life
Abrines' father, Gabriel, played basketball professionally in Spain for five teams from 1989 to 1999. Abrines was born in the Spanish city of Palma de Mallorca where his father retired from basketball.

References

External links

 
 Álex Abrines at acb.com 
 Álex Abrines at euroleague.net
 Álex Abrines at fiba.com
 
 
 
 

1993 births
Living people
2014 FIBA Basketball World Cup players
Baloncesto Málaga players
Basketball players at the 2016 Summer Olympics
Basketball players at the 2020 Summer Olympics
CB Axarquía players
FC Barcelona Bàsquet players
Liga ACB players
Medalists at the 2016 Summer Olympics
National Basketball Association players from Spain
Oklahoma City Thunder draft picks
Oklahoma City Thunder players
Olympic basketball players of Spain
Olympic bronze medalists for Spain
Olympic medalists in basketball
Shooting guards
Small forwards
Spanish expatriate basketball people in the United States
Spanish men's basketball players
Sportspeople from Palma de Mallorca